John S. Ruskay (born August 3, 1946), is executive vice president emeritus of UJA-Federation of New York and a senior partner of JRB Consulting Services. He served as a commissioner of the United States Commission on International Religious Freedom from May 2016 to May 2018. Ruskay is an author and lecturer on issues affecting the Jewish people.

Biography
Ruskay was a senior professional at UJA-Federation for 22 years beginning in 1993, the last 15 (1999–2014) as executive vice president and CEO. He called for the federation to become a creative resource for the creation of "inspired and caring communities" which can engage Jews on the basis of providing meaning, purpose and community, and forged bold initiatives to realize that vision.

Prior to UJA-Federation, Ruskay held senior leadership positions including vice chancellor, The Jewish Theological Seminary of America (1985–1993); and education director, the 92nd Street YM-YWHA (1980–1985). He also chaired the publication committee of the Journal of Jewish Communal Service and the professional advisory committee of the Brandeis University Hornstein Jewish Professional Leadership Program (2001–2007). Ruskay was a founding member of the controversial organization Breira (1972–1977), which took a left-wing position on Israeli-Palestinian political issues.

On December 8, 2009, John Ruskay's tenth anniversary as executive vice president and CEO of UJA-Federation was commemorated with a panel discussion about the organization's work of the last decade. Updating his 1999 inaugural address, Ruskay delivered a speech titled "Living Lives of Sacred Responsibility" in which he articulated four issues that require UJA-Federation's attention moving forward: 1) the affordability of Jewish life; 2) connecting the work of human service agencies to Jewish day schools, Hillels, and community centers; 3) reviewing the organization's future role in Israel; and 4) differentiating Israel advocacy and Israel education.

In 2014, Ruskay and Robin Bernstein created JRB Consulting Services LLC, which provides strategic consulting and coaching for a range of nonprofits. Clients have included UJA-Federation of New York, the Educational Alliance, the S. Daniel Abraham Center for Middle East Peace, the Jewish People Policy Planning Institute, Innovation Africa, the Yale Center for Social and Emotional Learning, Birthright Israel Foundation, among others. Prior to 2014, Ruskay served as a consultant to several of the major American Jewish foundations including the Wexner Foundation (1986–1998) and the Andrea and Charles Bronfman Philanthropies (1985–1996).

In May 2016, President Barack Obama appointed Ruskay to the United States Commission on International Religious Freedom (USCIRF), an independent federal body created by a 1998 Act of Congress reporting to the president, secretary of state, and Congress, for which he served a two-year term ending in May 2018.

Ruskay lives in New York with his wife Robin Bernstein, who served as CEO of the Educational Alliance from 1999 to 2014. They have five children and eight grandchildren.

Education

Ruskay earned his BA cum laude from the University of Pittsburgh (1968) majoring in European history, and his MA (1972) and PhD (1977) in political science from Columbia University, with a specialization in Middle East politics. His masters essay was a study of bi-nationalism during the British Mandate in Palestine. His dissertation was entitled "Non Institutional Mass Political Participation: The Role of Voluntary Groups in the Egyptian Revolution of 1919".

Honors 
Ruskay is recognized as a professional leader of the American Jewish community. He has received numerous honors including honorary doctorate degrees from Spertus Institute for Jewish Learning and Leadership (2011), the Jewish Theological Seminary of America (2011); Hebrew Union College (2013), Yeshiva University (2014), and the Reconstructionist Rabbinical College (2016). He also received the Bernard Riesman Award for Professional Excellence from Brandeis University (1995) and the Mandelkorn Distinguished Service Award from the Jewish Communal Service Association of North America (2003)

Articles and speeches 
Ruskay has written and speaks on how the American Jewish community can most effectively respond to the challenges and opportunities of living in an open society, the role of Jewish philanthropy, and the central role of community.
Beyond naming and shaming: New strategies needed to combat antisemitism, ejewishphilanthropy.com (2021)
Pew's Limited View, ejewishphilanthropy.com (2021)
Antisemitism and its Impact on Jewish Identity, JPPI (2021)
Israel Advocacy and Israel Education--Leadership Must Decide, JPPI (2021)
Healing Our Country Begins with the Right to Vote, Jewish Week (2020)
What Will Be Required, HUC-JIR (2013)
"page":12,"issue_id":103637} Funder Roundtable: A Conversation with Jenn Hoos Rothberg, Rafi Rone, Jennie Rosenn, John Ruskay, and Jon Rosenberg, Journal of Jewish Communal Service (2012) 
Combating Delegitimization Requires a Big Tent, Jewish Week (2011) 
Federations and Foundations Take On Innovating and Sustaining: A Dialogue with John Ruskay and Jeffrey Solomon, Journal of Jewish Communal Service (2011) 
Talking With John Ruskay: Looking Forward (2010)
F·E·G·S and UJA-Federation: Working Together to Strengthen the Community, Journal of Jewish Communal Service (2010)
Living Lives of Sacred Responsibility, UJA Federation NY (2009)
Innovation: One Size Does Not Fit All, eJewish Philanthropy (2009)
Organized Philanthropy's Relationship to Independent Jewish Philanthropy: A Dialogue between John Ruskay and Jeffrey Solomon, Journal of Jewish Communal Service (2009)
Sustaining Versus Innovative: Debunking a False Dichotomy, Contact (Winter 2006) 
UJA-Federation of New York: Strengthening a Global Jewish Identity (An Interview with John Ruskay), Jerusalem Center for Public Affairs
Strengthening Community Post September 11 (2002)
Looking Forward: Our Three-Pronged Challenge and Opportunity, Journal of Jewish Communal Service (2000)
Response "A Statement on the Jewish Future," American Jewish Committee (1998)
American Jewry's Focus on Continuity – At Ten Years (1999)
From Challenge to Opportunity: To Build Inspired Communities, Journal of Jewish Communal Service (1995) 
"From Challenge to : To Build Inspired Communities," Journal of Jewish Communal Service, Fall/Winter, 1995/6, pp. 22–33. 
"Historic Change and Communal Responsibility: The Jewish Communal Agenda and the Challenge of Emerging Philanthropic Trends," The 1996 Solender Lecture, UJA-Federation of New York, 1996. 
Zionism and the Conservative/Masorti Movement, co-editor with David Szonyi, Jewish Theological Seminary, 1990. 
"Diaspora-Israel Relations: The Potential Role of the Arts," Textures, Volume VII, Number 3 (June/July 1989). 
"Introduction," The Seminary at 100, edited by Nina Beth Cardin and David Wolfe Silverman, JTS/RA. 
"Adult Jewish Education: Continuing the Learning Experience," Jewish Education at the CJF General Assembly 1987, Council of Jewish Federation/Jewish Education Service of North American, 1988, New York. 
"Challenges for Moriah VI – and for the Future," Moriah Journal published by North American Jewish Forum, 1988. 
"The Challenge of Outreach: Examining a Living Model," The Melton Journal, Summer 1984. 
 More articles by John Ruskay on the Berman Jewish Policy Archive @ Stanford

References

External links 
 UJA-Federation of New York

20th-century American Jews
Living people
1946 births
University of Pittsburgh alumni
Columbia University alumni
21st-century American Jews